Xemu Records is an independent record label, with a roster of indie rock artists and bands.

History
Xemu Records is an independent record label, founded in 1992 in New York City by writer, filmmaker, musician, music producer and artist Cevin Soling as a vehicle for his music and music production endeavors. Originally conceived as a "record label" nod to underground cult movements of the 60's and 70's the label has since grown to be a home to burgeoning young bands in the psychedelic music and independent music scenes. Xemu Records uses the trademarked motto " We're Happier Than You Are" as well as the name "Xemu" to play on the myth of "Xemu"/"Xenu".

During the 1990s Xemu Records signed a number of alternative rock acts with regional success but it was in 2002 with the compilation album When Pigs Fly (Cevin Soling album), a collection of popular songs recorded by artists unlikely to record them, that the label gained international attention. Soling after his earlier success convincing Kevin DuBrow of Quiet Riot to record a mellow version of the song "Metal Health" with him, he got the idea for the project and began recruiting musicians to participate. Some of the songs on the album include a version of "Unforgettable" by Ani DiFranco and Jackie Chan, which he co-produced with DiFranco, Blondie's "Call Me" by Alex Chilton and his band The Box Tops, and a cover of "Shock The Monkey" by Don Ho which Soling also produced.

Later in 2002 after a chance meeting with bassist Steve Kille, of Dead Meadow, while on tour with The Brian Jonestown Massacre the two decided to join forces and redirect the label to reissue Dead Meadow's back catalog. After a few years of hiatus the first Dead Meadow reissue was released in 2006 "Dead Meadow" followed by Howls from the Hills 2007, "Three Kings" live film and double album 2010 and "Peel Session" in 2012. After the success of the Dead Meadow line of unreleased albums and reissues the label has since focused on releasing a schedule of full-time artists in the psych-alternative music scene. Xemu is also releasing a series of "children's books for grown-ups" called the Rumpleville Chronicles.

Roster
 The Carrions
 Dead Meadow
 DTCV
 La Cerca
 The Left Outsides
 The Love Kills Theory
 The Morning After Girls
 Old Testament
 Snowy Dunes
 Spindrift (band)
 Strangers Family Band
 Matthew J. Tow

Past
 Baby Alive
 Mikki James
 The Neanderthal Spongecake
 Poets and Slaves
 Scary Chicken
 The Sandra Wright Band
 The Smile Zone

See also 
 List of record labels

References

External links
Official site

Indie rock record labels
American independent record labels
1992 establishments in New York City
Companies based in New York City
Companies based in Los Angeles
Record labels established in 1992